Laggan (Gaelic: Lagan ) is a village in Badenoch, in the Highland region of Scotland. It is beside the River Spey, about 10 km west of Newtonmore. The A86 road passes through the village and crosses the river on a nearby bridge. It is notable as being the region in Badenoch where the Gaelic language survived the longest.

Laggan is in the Cairngorms National Park and featured as the fictional village of Glenbogle in the BBC TV drama series Monarch of the Glen where many of the locals took part in playing the minor background roles.

Nearby Visitor attractions include:
Ruins of the Pictish fort of Dun da Lamh near Strathmashie, Laggan.
The Laggan Wolftrax, a mountain biking centre located in the nearby Strathmashie Forest, opened in 2004.
Pottery Coffee Shop and Bunkhouse, on the A889 road between Dalwhinnie and Laggan offers homely bunkhouse and great home-baked cafe. Lounge overlooking hill, woodstove..." Peter Irvine, "Scotland the Best" 2008
Horse Riding and Pony Trekking: The popular outdoor sport of Pony Trekking was credited with being started in Badenoch at nearby Newtonmore in 1952 by Ewan Ormiston, it is still possible to ride with his grandson Ruaridh at the nearby Kingussie Riding Centre.

References

External links 
Laggan website

Populated places in Badenoch and Strathspey